Southbourne may refer to:

Southbourne, Dorset, a suburb of Bournemouth
Southbourne, West Sussex, a village in West Sussex
Southbourne (UK electoral ward)
Southbourne railway station, located in Southbourne, West Sussex